Wadi, alternatively wād, North African Arabic Oued, is the Arabic term traditionally referring to a valley. In some instances, it may refer to a wet (ephemeral) riverbed that contains water only when heavy rain occurs.

Etymology
The term  is very widely found in Arabic toponyms. Some Spanish toponyms are derived from Andalusian Arabic where  was used to mean a permanent river, for example: Guadalcanal from wādī al-qanāl ("river of refreshment stalls"), Guadalajara from wādī al-ḥijārah ("river of stones"), or Guadalquivir, from al-wādī al-kabīr ("the great river").

General morphology and processes
Wadis are located on gently sloping, nearly flat parts of deserts; commonly they begin on the distal portions of alluvial fans and extend to inland sabkhas or dry lakes. In basin and range topography, wadis trend along basin axes at the terminus of fans. Permanent channels do not exist, due to lack of continual water flow. They have braided stream patterns because of the deficiency of water and the abundance of sediments. Water percolates down into the stream bed, causing an abrupt loss of energy and resulting in vast deposition. Wadis may develop dams of sediment that change the stream patterns in the next flash flood.

Wind also causes sediment deposition. When wadi sediments are underwater or moist, wind sediments are deposited over them. Thus, wadi sediments contain both wind and water sediments.

Sediments and sedimentary structures
Wadi sediments may contain a range of material, from gravel to mud, and the sedimentary structures vary widely. Thus, wadi sediments are the most diverse of all desert environments.

Flash floods result from severe energy conditions and can result in a wide range of sedimentary structures, including ripples and common plane beds. Gravels commonly display imbrications, and mud drapes show desiccation cracks. Wind activity also generates sedimentary structures, including large-scale cross-stratification and wedge-shaped cross-sets. Sediment laid by water shows complete fining upward sequence. Gravels show imbrication. Wind deposits are cross-stratified and covered with mud-cracked deposits. Some horizontal loess may also be present.

Hydrological action

Modern English usage differentiates wadis from canyons or washes by the action and prevalence of water.  Wadis, as drainage courses, are formed by water, but are distinguished from river valleys or gullies in that surface water is intermittent or ephemeral. Wadis are generally dry year round, except after a rain. The desert environment is characterized by sudden but infrequent heavy rainfall, often resulting in flash floods. Crossing wadis at certain times of the year can be dangerous as a result.

Wadis tend to be associated with centers of human population because sub-surface water is sometimes available in them. Nomadic and pastoral desert peoples will rely on seasonal vegetation found in wadis, even in regions as dry as the Sahara, as they travel in complex transhumance routes.

The centrality of wadis to water – and human life – in desert environments gave birth to the distinct sub-field of wadi hydrology in the 1990s.

Deposits
Deposition in a wadi is rapid because of the sudden loss of stream velocity and seepage of water into the porous sediment. Wadi deposits are thus usually mixed gravels and sands. These sediments are often altered by eolian processes.

Over time, wadi deposits may become "inverted wadis," where former underground water caused vegetation and sediment to fill in the eroded channel, turning previous washes into ridges running through desert regions.

Gallery

See also

 
 
 
 
 
 
 
 
  in the Sinai peninsula, holy Muslim site

References

Bibliography
 Summary: Drainage Courses, Wadis. United States Army Corps of Engineers. Desert Processes Working Group; Knowledge Sciences, Inc. (n.d), retrieved 2008-08-26.
 Summary: Summary: Drainage Courses, Wadis – Inverted. United States Army Corps of Engineers. Desert Processes Working Group; Knowledge Sciences, Inc. (n.d), retrieved 2008-08-2onments
 Gelennie, K. W., 1970 Deserts sedimentary Environments. Developments in Sedimentology, v.14. Elsevier, Amsterdam, 222p.

External links

 IHP REGIONAL WADI HYDROLOGY NETWORK, International Hydrological Programme, UNESCO.
 Arab Center for Studies of Arid Zones and Dry lands (ACSAD): Water resources division.

 01
Dry or seasonal streams
Canyons and gorges
Fluvial landforms
Valleys
Arabic words and phrases